William Conyngham Plunket, 4th Baron Plunket (26 August 1828 – 1 April 1897) was Dean of Christ Church Cathedral and Archbishop of Dublin in the Church of Ireland.

Life 
Born in Dublin, he was the eldest son of John Plunket, 3rd Baron Plunket and Charlotte Bushe. Plunket was educated at Cheltenham College and Trinity College, Dublin (B.A. 1853; M.A. 1864) before being appointed chaplain and private secretary to his uncle, the Bishop of Tuam, in 1857, a post he held for seven years. The following year, he became Rector of Kilmoyan and Cummer in County Galway. In 1864, he returned to Dublin as Treasurer of St Patrick's Cathedral, of which he was appointed Precentor in 1869.

In 1876, Lord Plunket (as he became on succeeding his father in 1871) was consecrated Bishop of Meath, and in 1884 he was finally appointed Archbishop of Dublin, an office he held until his death. In 1871 he inherited Old Connaught and decided to move into the house and surrounding property as he had spent a lot of time there with his grandfather. He was Dean of Christ Church Cathedral from 1884 until 1887 (when he was succeeded by his brother-in-law's nephew William Greene). Plunket received an honorary degree from Cambridge University in 1888. He also served as a Commissioner of Education from 1895 onwards and was a senator of the Royal University of Ireland.

He was instrumental in developing the Kildare Place Schools (the Church of Ireland teacher training college), and he was an advocate and supporter of the reformed faith in Spain, Portugal and Italy.

Family 
 
In 1863 he married Anne Lee Guinness, daughter of Sir Benjamin Lee Guinness. Their son William was to have a successful career in government administration. Another son, Benjamin, served as Bishop of Meath and was the father of Olive, Countess Fitzwilliam. His sister married John Darley, bishop of Kilmore, Elphin, and Ardagh. His wife having predeceased him in 1889, Lord Plunket died aged 68 in Dublin, and he was buried in Mount Jerome Cemetery. His statue near Leinster House in Kildare Street, Dublin is a landmark.

References 

Plunket, William Conyngham Plunket, 4th Baron
Plunket, William Conyngham Plunket, 4th Baron
Anglican archbishops of Dublin
Anglican bishops of Meath
Barons in the Peerage of the United Kingdom
Eldest sons of British hereditary barons
Burials at Mount Jerome Cemetery and Crematorium
Deans of Christ Church Cathedral, Dublin
Ordained peers
Alumni of Trinity College Dublin
People educated at Cheltenham College
Christian clergy from Dublin (city)
Irish Anglican archbishops